Eugenie Carol Scott (born October 24, 1945) is an American physical anthropologist, a former university professor and educator who has been active in opposing the teaching of young Earth creationism and intelligent design in schools. She coined the term "Gish gallop" to describe a fallacious rhetorical technique which consists in overwhelming an interlocutor with as many individually weak arguments as possible, in order to prevent rebuttal of the whole argument.

From 1986 to 2014, Scott served as the Executive Director of the National Center for Science Education, a nonprofit science education organization supporting teaching of evolutionary science. Since 2013, Scott has been listed on their advisory council.

Scott holds a Ph.D. in biological anthropology from the University of Missouri. A biologist, her research has been in human medical anthropology and skeletal biology. Scott serves on the Board of Trustees of Americans United for Separation of Church and State. Scott is a member of the Board of Advisers for the publication, Scientific American. She is also a Fellow of the Committee for Skeptical Inquiry (CSI) and GWUP.

Early life and education
Scott grew up in Wisconsin and first became interested in anthropology after reading her sister's anthropology textbook.
Scott received BS and MS degrees from the University of Wisconsin–Milwaukee, followed by a PhD from the University of Missouri. She joined the University of Kentucky as a physical anthropologist in 1974, and shortly thereafter attended a debate between her mentor James A. Gavan and the young Earth creationist Duane Gish, which piqued her interest in the creation–evolution controversy.  She also taught at the University of Colorado and at California State University, Hayward. Her research work focused on medical anthropology, and skeletal biology.

Career
In 1980, Scott worked to prevent creationism from being taught in the public schools of Lexington, Kentucky. Scott was appointed the executive director of the National Center for Science Education in 1987, the year in which requiring the teaching of creation science in American public schools was deemed illegal by the Supreme Court in Edwards v. Aguillard. Scott announced that she would be retiring from this position by the end of 2013, doing so on 6 January 2014. Her place was taken by Ann Reid.

Worldview 

Scott was brought up in Christian Science by her mother and grandmother but later switched to a congregational church under the influence of her sister; she describes her background as liberal Protestant. Scott is now a secular humanist and describes herself as a nontheist. In 2003, the San Francisco Chronicle reported that, "Scott describes herself as atheist but does not discount the importance of spirituality." In 2003 she was one of the signatories to the third humanist manifesto, Humanism and Its Aspirations.

Authorship 
Scott is an expert on creationism and intelligent design. Her book Evolution vs. Creationism: An Introduction was published by Greenwood Press in 2004 and then in paperback by the University of California Press in 2005. Niles Eldredge wrote the foreword  in the first edition. A second edition of the book was published in 2008 and in paperback in 2009. The foreword to this edition was written by John E. Jones III, who was the presiding judge in the Kitzmiller v. Dover court case.

She co-edited with Glenn Branch the 2006 anthology Not in Our Classrooms: Why Intelligent Design is Wrong for Our Schools.

In 2006 Jon D. Miller, Scott and Shinji Okamoto had a brief article published in Science entitled "Public Acceptance of Evolution", an analysis of polling on the acceptance of evolution from the last 20 years in the United States and compared to other countries.  Turkey had the lowest acceptance of evolution in the survey, with the United States having the next-lowest, though the authors saw a positive in the higher percentage of Americans who are unsure about evolution, and therefore "reachable" for evolution.

Media appearances 

David Berlinski, a fellow at the Discovery Institute, describes Scott as an opponent "who is often sent out to defend Darwin". Scott prefers to see herself as "Darwin's golden retriever".

Scott has been profiled in The New York Times, Scientific American, The Scientist, the San Francisco Chronicle, and the Stanford Medical Magazine.  She has had been interviewed for Science & Theology News, CSICOP, Church & State and Point of Inquiry. She has commentary published by Science & Theology News, Metanexus Institute.

Scott has taken part in numerous debates on MSNBC and Fox News.

In 2004, Scott represented the National Center for Science Education on the Showtime television show Penn & Teller: Bullshit!, on the episode titled "Creationism", where she offered philosophical views about the creationist and intelligent design movements.

Kitzmiller v. Dover Area School District 

In 2005, Scott and other NCSE staff served as scientific and educational consultants for the plaintiffs in the Kitzmiller v. Dover Area School District case regarding the teaching of intelligent design in public schools. Judge John Jones ruled in favor of the plaintiffs.  Scott said that "we won decisively" and "in triplicate," and "we had the better case."  About the merits of the case, she said, "Within evolutionary biology, we argue about the details... and the mechanisms," but "we don't argue about whether living things descended with modification from common ancestors, which is what biological evolution is all about....  The Dover School Board wanted students to doubt whether evolution had taken place."

Awards 

2009 The Stephen J Gould Prize awarded by the Society for the Study of Evolution "to recognize individuals whose sustained and exemplary efforts have advanced public understanding of evolutionary science and its importance in biology, education, and everyday life in the spirit of Stephen Jay Gould."

2009 The Fellows Medal awarded by the California Academy of Sciences.  The award is the Academy's highest honor, awarded in recognition of a recipient's notable contributions to one or more of the natural sciences.

2010 The Public Welfare Medal awarded by the U.S. National Academy of Sciences "in recognition of distinguished contributions in the application of science to the public welfare." It is the most prestigious honor conferred by the Academy.

2012 The Richard Dawkins Award presented by the Atheist Alliance of America "to individuals it judges to have raised the public consciousness of atheism"

2018 The Pojeta Award from the Paleontological Society.  The award recognizes "exceptional professional or public service by individuals or groups in the field of paleontology above and beyond that of existing formal roles or responsibilities"

2019 Fellow for the German Skeptic group Gesellschaft zur wissenschaftlichen Untersuchung von Parawissenschaften GWUP

Personal life
Scott and her husband, lawyer Thomas C. Sager, have one daughter and reside in Berkeley, California.

Scott is a backyard beekeeper with two beehives, and is interested in colony collapse disorder and an advocate of amateur beekeeping.

Bibliography
 Also: Westport, Connecticut: Greenwood Press.

References

External links 
 Eugenie Scott from the National Center for Science Education
 Eugenie Scott on Teaching Evolution,  Books and Ideas
Eugenie Scott's Talk: "The Right to Teach Evolution"

1945 births
20th-century American scientists
20th-century American anthropologists
20th-century American women scientists
21st-century American scientists
21st-century American anthropologists
21st-century American women scientists
American atheists
American former Protestants
American humanists
American skeptics
American women anthropologists
California State University, East Bay faculty
Critics of creationism
Living people
People from Berkeley, California
Science activists
Science communicators
Scientists from the San Francisco Bay Area
Secular humanists
American social commentators
University of Missouri alumni
University of Wisconsin–Milwaukee alumni